Brauncewell is a hamlet and former civil parish in the North Kesteven district of Lincolnshire, England. From the census 2011 the population is included in the civil parish of Cranwell, Brauncewell and Byard's Leap. It is situated between Leadenham and the market town of Sleaford, and is north east from, and in close proximity to, RAF Cranwell.

Brauncewell Grade II listed Anglican parish church is dedicated to All Saints. Built in the 16th century over an earlier church, it was largely rebuilt in 1857. It includes a grave cover in the nave dated between the 10th and 12th century. The church is now redundant.

Brauncewell is close to a large quarry.

A Bronze Age Barrow burial site, and Roman sites, have been identified within the parish.

The parish contains the remains of two deserted medieval villages:
Brauncewell, east of Brauncewell   
Dunsby, east-south-east of Brauncewell

References

External links

Villages in Lincolnshire
Former civil parishes in Lincolnshire
North Kesteven District